Mount Cilley is  peak in the White Mountains of New Hampshire. The wooded mountain is in the town of Woodstock, west of the Pemigewasset River and northeast of Elbow Pond. It was named for General Joseph Cilley.

References

Further reading
 Mount Cilley, New Hampshire at Peakbagger.com

White Mountains (New Hampshire)
Cilley
Cilley